Neodiaptomus intermedius is a species of freshwater copepod, in the family Diaptomidae. It lives in South India's inland freshwater areas of the Nilgiri Hills, Tirmala Hills, Kaza, and at Shornur. It inhabits any bodies of water in plains or elevated hills.

References 

Arthropods of India
Freshwater crustaceans of Asia
Crustaceans described in 1984